Mount Egerton may refer to:

 Mount Egerton, Victoria, a town in Australia
 Mount Egerton in the Churchill Mountains of Antarctica